Mohtaram Eskandari (1895 – July 27, 1924), was an Iranian intellectual and a pioneer of the Iranian women's movement. She was the co-founder and first leader of Jam'iyat-e Nesvan-e Vatankhah, the first women's rights association in Persia.

As the first chairperson and publisher of the Nesvan Watan Khaw newspaper, Eskandari provided lectures in support of women's rights, including women's education and the removal of veils. She planned marches for members of the association as well.

Biography
Mohtaram was born in 1895 into a liberal, intellectually vibrant and politically active family in Tehran. Her father, Mohammad Ali Mirza Eskandari (Prince of Ali Khan), was a constitutionalist and founder of the Adamiat Society and taught at Dar ul-Funun. She first studied at home with her father, and received an education in Persian and French literature under the supervision of Mirza Mohammad Ali Khan Mohaqqeqi. Eskandari and Mohaqqeqi would later marry. They both got married after a while.

As an adult, Eskandari suffered from spinal cord injury, was teaching for some time, and served as the director of a state school for girls. Her dissatisfaction with the state of women's rights in Persia after the Constitutional Revolution, led her to establish Jam'iyat-e Nesvan-e Vatankhah, "Patriotic Women's League of Iran," in 1922, which uniquely molded together feminism and Iranian nationalism.

She was disappointed with the achievements of the Constitutional Revolution for women, so in 1922, along with a number of leading women in Tehran, she established the Patriotic Women’s Association. She lectured, administered the Association's magazine, and planned the community’s marches. In one of the rallies, they burned leaflets against women, which resulted in Mohtaram’s arrest by the government officials. But this made her name to be well-known among the people of Iran. She also founded a school for adult women and advertised for the use of national goods.

Mohtaram Eskandari died at the age of 29 in Tehran on July 1924 – 1925, due to complications from a back surgery she had undergone as a child.

Women's association
In the year 1922, the Patriotic Women’s Association was established with the esteemed work of Mohtaram Eskandari, Nurolhouda Mangeneh, Mastureh Afshar and Madam Fakhr Afagh. The right of education for women was one of the most important goals of this association.

With ten elected women, the board of directors was formed by the Patriotic Women's Association, and the same delegation elected Eskandari as the first head of the community.

The association "Patriotic Women", on the path to the goals of women's education and learning, published the magazine Nasvan–e Vatankhah (Persian:The Patriotic Women), in the wake of the launch of classes for older women. The magazine was the official organ of the community that focused on women's issues and women's rights. Its owner was Madam Molouk Eskandari, and its first director was Mohtaram Eskandari. The magazine published eleven issues over three years (from 1923 to 1926) and attracted many liberal women.

Rebel on women’s wickedness
"Wicked Women", is the name given to a book by a number of opponents of women's education and freedom in Tehran. This leaflet was sold by the boys in the main squares of the city. Noor-ol-Hoda Mangeneh has written in her memories’ pamphlet how insulting the leaflet was and mentioned the below:

Then one day, Mohtaram Eskandari, along with seven liberal women, went to the Toopkhaneh Square to remove the "Wicked Women" leaflets from the hands of the children there. They set the leaflets on fire in the middle of the square, in the same exact place of were the constitutionalists were once hanged. When those kids asked for the money of the leaflets to be given to them, Mohtaram and the other liberal women mentioned to them that they will not receive any money.

Arrested for rebellion
After burning the books in the square and the children crying loudly for their burned books, police arrested the women there and took them to the commission (Police station and the first interrogation area of the accused). The women were taken in different rooms and interrogated separately. In the book "Iranian Woman from Constitutionalism to the White Revolution", Badr al-Molouk wrote:

Mohtaram Eskandari's name was recorded as the first woman who was arrested in contemporary history for rebellion in Iran.

Illness and death 
Mohtaram was hospitalized for some time after the arrest and advent of burning the leaflets due to the severity of the illness she had and doctors said surgery should be performed on the vertebral column's. She was suffering from the disease ever since childhood and also she was made fun of since her back was always bent, but at the last minutes of her life, she continued her efforts for women's equality and advised the women in the Patriotic Women’s Association not to leave a moment of their work for women and continue for gaining women rights.

Finally, Mohtaram Eskandari died in July 1924, when she was 29 years old. Her death brought sorrow and sadness among those who distinguished and worked with her.

Sediqeh Dowlatabadi wrote in the deed of Mohtaram:

The late incident of losing Mohtaram Eskandari, has depressed me so much that I cannot explain it, because I know the great efforts of this brave Iranian girl and I conceive her loss as a great misfortune. Yes, her sacrifices were admirable. I will never forget that they repeatedly condemned her at the conferences. But she listened to everything and tried not to get herself distraught or upset. With steady steps and determination she continued her goals. In my life she was the first Iranian woman I have seen who never got tired in doing all she can to reach the goal she had in mind. I just hope that all the women of my homeland do not let the work of this respectable woman go away and that the foundation she had established will not break.

See also
Iranian women
Persian Constitutional Revolution
Women's rights movement in Iran
Women's rights in Iran

References

Sources
 Sanasarian, Eliz. The Women's Rights Movements in Iran, Praeger, New York: 1982, .
 Nahid, Abdolhossein, Iranian Women in the Constitutional Movement, Tabriz, published by Ehya, 1981. 
 Pouran Farokhzad, Iranian Women's Carnivals (From yesterday to today). Tehran, published by Ghatreh, 2002. 
 Yervand Abrahamian, Iran between Two Revolutions: From Constitutionalism to Islamic Revolution. Translation by Kazem Firuzmand, Hasan Shamsiyahi, Mohsen the Director of Shanachi. Second print, published by Markaz, 1999, page 146.

External links
 Mehrangiz Dowlatshahi-- ESKANDARĪ,MOḤTARAM in Encyclopædia Iranica.

1895 births
1924 deaths
Qajar princesses
Iranian women journalists
Iranian writers
Iranian women writers
Iranian women's rights activists